Giorgos Papadopoulos can refer to:

 Giorgos Papadopoulos (singer), born 1985
 Giorgos Papadopoulos (footballer, born 1914)
 Giorgos Papadopoulos (footballer, born 1991)
 Georgios Papadopoulos, Greek military officer (1919–1999)

See also
 George Papadopoulos (disambiguation)